The 91st 24 Hours of Le Mans or the Centenary 24 Hours of Le Mans is an automobile endurance event that is scheduled to take place on 10–11 June 2023 at the Circuit de la Sarthe in Le Mans, France. It will be the 91st running of the 24-hour race organised by the Automobile Club de l'Ouest, taking place on the 100th anniversary of the first 24 Hours of Le Mans in 1923, and the fourth round of the 2023 FIA World Endurance Championship.

Entries

Automatic entries
Teams which won championships in the European Le Mans Series (ELMS), Asian Le Mans Series (ALMS) and the Michelin Le Mans Cup (MLMC), received automatic entry invitations. The second-place finishers in the 2022 ELMS in LMP2 and LMGTE championships also received an automatic invitation. Three participants from the IMSA SportsCar Championship (WTSC) were chosen by the ACO as automatic entries, regardless of performance or category. Teams earning automatic entries in LMP2 were allowed to change their cars from the previous year. ELMS LMGTE and ALMS GT teams earning automatic entries were allowed to use them in LMGTE Am only. The European and Asian LMP3 (Le Mans Prototype 3) champion was required to field an entry in LMP2, and the Michelin Le Mans Cup Group GT3 (GT3) champion was limited to the LMGTE Am category.

Entry list

Entries in the LMP2 Pro-Am Cup, set aside for teams with a Bronze-rated driver in their line-up, are denoted with Icons.

Reserve entries
	
In addition to the sixty-two entries given invitations for the race, ten entries were put on a reserve list to potentially replace any invitations that were not accepted or withdrawn. Reserve entries are ordered with the first reserve replacing the first withdrawal from the race, regardless of the class of either entry.

Garage 56
On March 17, 2022, NASCAR and Hendrick Motorsports announced they will field a Next Gen Chevrolet Camaro ZL1 as a Garage 56 entry, the first since 2021, marking NASCAR's first presence at Le Mans since 1976 when a Dodge Charger and Ford Torino competed.

Numerous modifications were made to a Cup Series model, including a larger fuel cell and spoiler, canards and dive planes resulting in a weight loss of 525 lbs compared to the Cup Series car.

On January 28, 2023, on the weekend of the 24 Hours of Daytona, the three drivers for the Garage 56 entry were announced to be 2009 Formula One champion Jenson Button, seven-time Cup Series champion Jimmie Johnson and 2010 Le Mans winner Mike Rockenfeller.

Notes

References

External links
 

Le Mans
2023
Le Mans
Le Mans